Calling All Kids is a 1943 Our Gang short comedy film directed by Sam Baerwitz. It was the 214th Our Gang short (215th episode, 126th talking short, 127th talking episode, 46th MGM-produced episode) released.

Plot
Calling All Kids finds the gang invading a local radio station to perform a revue honoring the U.S. military. Amidst such highlights as a "recruiting office" sketch featuring the duo of Mickey and Froggy, and a closing ensemble piece with lyrics that rhyme "Taxes" with "Axis," the film features an extended celebrity-impression routine, with Buckwheat imitating Eddie "Rochester" Anderson and other kids posing as Judy Garland, Eleanor Powell, Fred Astaire, Carmen Miranda, and Virginia O'Brien.  Fun episode but the Coast Guard was left out.

Cast
 Bobby Blake as Mickey
 Janet Burston as Janet/Carmen Miranda
 Billy Laughlin as Froggy
 Billie Thomas as Buckwheat/Rochester

Additional cast
 Jackie Horner as Eleanor Powell
 Marlene Kinghorn as Girl singer/Judy Garland
 Marlene Mains as Virginia O'Brien
 David Polonsky as Fred Astaire
 Eleanor Taylor as Marine
 Frank Ward as Marine
 Giovanna Gubitosi as Audience member
 James Gubitosi as Audience member
 Tommy McFarland as Audience member
 Eddie Anderson - Voice-over for Buckwheat
 Mark Daniels - NBC Radio announcer

See also
 Our Gang filmography

References

External links

1943 films
American black-and-white films
Metro-Goldwyn-Mayer short films
1943 comedy films
Our Gang films
1943 short films
1940s American films